London EV Company Limited (LEVC, formerly The London Taxi Corporation Limited trading as The London Taxi Company) is a British automotive electric vehicle manufacturer with its headquarters at Ansty near Coventry, England, and a wholly-owned subsidiary of Chinese automaker Geely. The company is responsible for the electrical conversion of London’s famous black taxicabs.

History

Geely's involvement in British taxicab production began in 2006 when it partnered with LEVC's predecessor The London Taxi Company, and its parent Manganese Bronze Holdings, in the creation of a China-based taxicab manufacturing joint venture. In 2008, Geely considered the possibility of converting London's black cabs into electric-powered vehicles. In 2009 Geely bought shares in Manganese Bronze Holdings.

In 2012 Manganese Bronze Holdings entered administration due to lack of funding. In 2013 Geely rescued part of the business and created its own taxicab production company as The London Taxi Corporation Limited.

The joint venture, Shanghai LTI Automobile Components Co Ltd, makes the TX4, a licensed London Black Cab, in Fengjing, Shanghai, and exports semi-complete knock-down kits for assembly in the UK.

From 2014, Geely invested £480m in LEVC to develop a new taxi. In March 2015, LEVC announced a new factory and offices would be built at Ansty Park, northeast of Coventry at a cost of £90m, creating 1,000 jobs. Geely hoped to manufacture 36,000 vehicles per annum.

In 2017, the company launched the new LEVC TX electric hybrid taxi and announced its intentions to begin production of electric commercial vehicles in addition to taxicabs.

Models

TX

Geely had been in talks over the possibility of converting London's black cabs into electric-powered vehicles. The company said it has held talks with UK government officials about the plan.
 By April 2022, over 5,000 TX's has been sold in London, around a third of London's taxi fleet.

VN5

An electric van was revealed by LEVC on 17 June 2019, and will be available to order in the second half of 2020. In March 2020, LEVC confirmed that the new van would be called LEVC VN5.

References

External links
 

 
Vehicle manufacturing companies established in 2013
British companies established in 2013
British subsidiaries of foreign companies
2013 establishments in England